Santiria griffithii is a species of plant in the Burseraceae family. It is found in Indonesia, Malaysia, and Singapore.

References

griffithii
Least concern plants
Taxonomy articles created by Polbot